Anna Herrmann (born 6 November 1987) is a German actor.

Life
Born in Berlin, she made her screen debuts as a child actor in the TV series Hinter Gittern – Der Frauenknast and the film As Far as My Feet Will Carry Me. From  2014 to 2018 she trained at the Hochschule für Musik und Theater „Felix Mendelssohn Bartholdy“ Leipzig. There her appearances included Viel Lärm um nichts, a German translation of William Shakespeare's Much Ado About Nothing. In 2015 and 2016 she was awarded the Grimmepreis award. She has also appeared in TV adverts for companies including Media Markt.

Selected filmography

TV series
 1999–2002: Hinter Gittern – Der Frauenknast (25 episodes) 
 2010: Tatort: Mord in der ersten Liga
 2013: SOKO Köln: Der Gartenpirat
 2014: SOKO Leipzig – Mr. Green
 2014: Weinberg (4 episodes)
 2015: Homeland (2 episodes)
 2016: Die Spezialisten – Im Namen der Opfer: Die Mädchen aus Ost-Berlin
 2017: Notruf Hafenkante: Todesraser
 2017: SOKO Leipzig: Aus der Deckung
 2017: Polizeiruf 110: Dünnes Eis
 2017: Bad Cop – kriminell gut – Kindsköpfe
 2017: Siebenstein – Rudi und die goldene Kugel
 2017: Schuld nach Ferdinand von Schirach – Anatomie 
 2018: Rosamunde Pilcher: Wo dein Herz wohnt
 2018: SOKO Köln: Tod in der Milchstraße
 2018: SOKO Köln: Fatale Begierdeod in der Milchstraße
 2019: Der Usedom-Krimi: Geisterschiff
 2019: In aller Freundschaft – Die jungen Ärzte: Rollenmuster
 2019: SOKO Leipzig: Mein Kind
 2019: Tatort: Der gute Weg
 2019: Skylines (Netflix series, 6 episodes)
 2019: Der Bergdoktor: Déjà-Vu
 2020: Notruf Hafenkante: Pick-Up-Artist
 2020: Der Staatsanwalt: Fangschuss
 2020: Letzte Spur Berlin: Amöbenliebe
 2020: WaPo Berlin: MS Bettina
 2020: In aller Freundschaft: Hoffnung ist keine Strategie
 2020: Bettys Diagnose: Hitzewelle
 2021: SOKO Stuttgart: Vermisst
 2021: SOKO Hamburg: Kiezliebe
 2021: Tatort: Hetzjagd
 2021: Morden im Norden: Absturz
 2021: Nord Nord Mord: Sievers und der schwarze Engel
 2021: Fritzie – Der Himmel muss warten (5 episodes)
 2022: Die Toten vom Bodensee – Das zweite Gesicht

TV films
 2018: Für meine Tochter
 2019: Brecht
 2021: Die Luft zum Atmen

Films
 2001: As Far as My Feet Will Carry Me
 2011: Trattoria
 2015: Die Schweigeminute
 2017: Millennials
 2017: Ein schrecklich reiches Paar

Short films
 2008: Der Streit der Waisenmädchen 
 2009: Luzi
 2010: Das Parfüm
 2010: Die Nacht davor 
 2012: Kindergeburtstag 
 2012: Versammelt 
 2012: Stille Tage 
 2013: Leb Wohl, Adieu, Gute Nacht

Diploma films
 2013: Neverland Now 
 2014: Millenilas
 2014: Arielle

References

External links 
 https://www.imdb.com/name/nm0379245/
 https://www.crew-united.com/de/profilansichten/?IDM=134747
 https://www.filmportal.de/3718a2c95609403880873e0821091ed7
 Anna Herrmann on castupload.com
 Anna Herrmann - profile on Agentur Velvet

1987 births
Living people
People from Berlin
German film actresses
German television actresses